Navind Sharmaph Ramsaran (born 10 April 1961) is a former Mauritian wrestler. He competed in the heavyweight Greco-Roman and freestyle competitions at the 1988 Summer Olympics. Ramsaran won a bronze medal in the 1987 All-Africa Games in the Greco-Roman heavyweight category.

References

External links
 

1961 births
Living people
Mauritian people of Indian descent
Wrestlers at the 1988 Summer Olympics
Mauritian male sport wrestlers
Olympic wrestlers of Mauritius
African Games bronze medalists for Mauritius
African Games medalists in wrestling
Competitors at the 1987 All-Africa Games